The runoff curve number (also called a curve number or simply CN) is an empirical parameter used in hydrology for predicting direct runoff or infiltration from rainfall excess. The curve number method was developed by the USDA Natural Resources Conservation Service, which was formerly called the Soil Conservation Service or SCS — the number is still popularly known as a "SCS runoff curve number" in the literature.  The runoff curve number was developed from an empirical analysis of runoff from small catchments and hillslope plots monitored by the USDA. It is widely used and is an efficient method for determining the approximate amount of direct runoff from a rainfall event in a particular area.

Definition
The runoff curve number is based on the area's hydrologic soil group, land use, treatment and hydrologic condition. References, such as from USDA indicate the runoff curve numbers for characteristic land cover descriptions and a hydrologic soil group.

The runoff equation is:

where

 is runoff ([L]; in)
 is rainfall ([L]; in)
 is the potential maximum soil moisture retention after runoff begins ([L]; in)
 is the initial abstraction ([L]; in), or the amount of water before runoff, such as infiltration, or rainfall interception by vegetation; historically, it has generally been assumed that , although more recent research has found that  may be a more appropriate relationship in urbanized watersheds where the CN is updated to reflect developed conditions.

The runoff curve number, is then related

 has a range from 30 to 100; lower numbers indicate low runoff potential while larger numbers are for increasing runoff potential. The lower the curve number, the more permeable the soil is. As can be seen in the curve number equation, runoff cannot begin until the initial abstraction has been met. It is important to note that the curve number methodology is an event-based calculation, and should not be used for a single annual rainfall value, as this will incorrectly miss the effects of antecedent moisture and the necessity of an initial abstraction threshold.

Selection
The NRCS curve number is related to soil type, soil infiltration capability, land use, and the depth of the seasonal high water table. To account for different soils' ability to infiltrate, NRCS has divided soils into four hydrologic soil groups (HSGs). They are defined as follows.

HSG Group A (low runoff potential): Soils with high infiltration rates even when thoroughly wetted. These consist chiefly of deep, well-drained sands and gravels.
HSG Group B Soils with moderate infiltration rates when thoroughly wetted. These consist chiefly of soils that are moderately deep to deep, moderately well drained to well drained with moderately fine to moderately coarse textures.
HSG Group C: Soils with slow infiltration rates when thoroughly wetted. These consist chiefly of soils with a layer that impedes downward movement of water or soils with moderately fine to fine textures.
HSG Group D (high runoff potential): Soils with very slow infiltration rates when thoroughly wetted. These consist chiefly of clay soils with a high swelling potential, soils with a permanent high water table, soils with a claypan or clay layer at or near the surface, and shallow soils over nearly impervious materials.

Selection of a hydrologic soil group should be done based on measured infiltration rates, soil survey (such as the NRCS Web Soil Survey), or judgement from a qualified soil science or geotechnical professional. The table below presents curve numbers for antecedent soil moisture condition II (average moisture condition). To alter the curve number based on moisture condition or other parameters, see Adjustments.

Values

Adjustments

Runoff is affected by the soil moisture before a precipitation event, the antecedent moisture condition (AMC). The AMC factors can be looked up in the reference table below. Find the CN value for AMC II and multiply it by the adjustment factor based on the actual AMC to determine the adjusted curve number.

Initial abstraction ratio adjustment

The relationship  was derived from the study of many small, experimental watersheds . In the model fitting done by Hawkins et al. More than 90 percent of  ratios were less than 0.2. Based on this study, use of  ratios of 0.05 rather than the commonly used value of 0.20 would seem more appropriate. Thus, the CN runoff equation becomes:

The user, then, must do the following to use the adjusted 0.05 initial abstraction ratio:

 Use the traditional tables of curve numbers to select the value appropriate for your watershed.
 Calculate  using the traditional equation:
 Convert this S value to  using the relationship above.
 Calculate the runoff depth using the CN runoff equation above (with 0.05 substituted for the initial abstraction ratio).

See also
Hydrological modelling
Runoff model (reservoir)
Recharge (hydrology)

References

External links
SCS TR-55 Peak Discharge and Runoff Calculator
Curve Number Calculator Online Free Curve Number Calculator
Introduction to SCS Runoff Curve Number Method

Hydrology
Soil physics